Oberea sinense is a species of beetle in the family Cerambycidae. It was described by Maurice Pic in 1902.

References

Beetles described in 1902
sinense